Fricsay is a Hungarian surname. Notable people with the surname include:

 András Fricsay (born 1942), German actor and director 
 Ferenc Fricsay (1914–1963), Hungarian conductor

Hungarian-language surnames